Jagdish Singh Dhanoa Kuldip Singh (born 29 April 1993) is a Malaysian male badminton player. In 2013, he won the men's doubles bronze medal at the Summer Universiade in Kazan, Russia.

Achievements

Summer Universiade 
Men's doubles

BWF International Challenge/Series
Men's doubles

 BWF International Challenge tournament
 BWF International Series tournament
 BWF Future Series tournament

References

External links 
 

Living people
1993 births
Malaysian sportspeople of Indian descent
Malaysian people of Punjabi descent
Malaysian male badminton players
Universiade medalists in badminton
Universiade bronze medalists for Malaysia
Medalists at the 2013 Summer Universiade
Medalists at the 2015 Summer Universiade
Medalists at the 2017 Summer Universiade
21st-century Malaysian people